Christoffel is a Dutch and Afrikaans cognate of the masculine given name Christopher. Short forms include Chris, Christie, Kristof, and Stoffel.  Christoffel also occurs as a patronymic surname. People with the name include:

Given name
Christoffel van den Berghe (1590–), Flemish-born Dutch landscape and still life painter
Christoffel Beudeker (–1756), Dutch merchant, landowner and map collector
Christoffel Bisschop (1828–1904), Dutch genre painter and lithographer
Christoffel Brand (1797–1875), South African jurist, politician, and statesman
Christoffel Brand (Simon's Town)  A host at Simon's Town, South Africa welcoming ships using it as a refreshment station. 
Christoffel Brändli (born 1943), Swiss politician
Christoffel Cornelius "Chris" Dednam (born 1983), South African badminton player
Christoffel van Dijck (1606–1669), Dutch printer, engraver, and type designer
Christoffel Cornelis "Stoffel" Froneman (1846–1913), Orange Free State general
Christoffel von Grimmelshausen (1621–1676), German author
Christoffel "Chris" Hooijkaas (1861–1926), Dutch sailor
Christoffel van IJsselstein (died aft.1510), Dutch noble of the House of Egmond
Christoffel Jegher (1596–1652), Flemish Baroque engraver
Christoffel Jacobsz van der Laemen (1607–), Flemish painter 
Christoffel Lubienietzky (1659–1729), Pomeranian-born Dutch painter and engraver  
Christoffel "Stoffel" Muller (1776–1833), Dutch Protestant sect leader
Christoffel Nortje (born 1940s), South African dentist and radiologist
Christoffel Pierson (1631–1714), Dutch still life painter
Christoffel Plantijn (–1589), French-born Flemish Renaissance humanist and book printer and publisher
Christoffel van Sichem (1581–1658), Dutch woodcutter and engraver
Christoffel van Swoll (1668–1718), Dutch Governor-General of the Dutch East Indies
Christoffel "Christie" van Wyk (born 1977), Namibian sprinter
Christoffel Venter (1892–1977), South African military commander
Christoffel "Christie" Viljoen (born 1987), Namibian cricketer
Christo Wiese (born 1941), South African businessman
Jan Christoffel G. "Stoffel" Botha (1929–1998), South African politician, Minister of Home Affairs
Pieter Christoffel Wonder (1780–1852), Dutch painter active in England

Surname
Elwin Bruno Christoffel (1829–1900), German mathematician and physicist
Named after him: Christoffel equation, Christoffel symbols, Schwarz–Christoffel mapping, Christoffel–Darboux formula
Louis Christoffel (1886–?), Belgian wrestler
Martin Christoffel (1922–2001), Swiss chess player
Nathan Christoffel (born 1982), Australian film director

See also
Christoffelberg, highest point on Curaçao
Christoffelpark, a protected nature area around this mountain
Christoffelturm, a tower in Bern, Switzerland, between 1344 and 1865
, Dutch brewery

Dutch masculine given names
Patronymic surnames